Non Stop Ride is a cover album by American Industrial rock band Godhead. It features covers of The Prodigy's Smack My Bitch Up, KMFDM's Virus and Blur's Girls and Boys.

Track listing
Funker Vogt - Narayan
Zeromancer - Doctor Online
Haujobb - Smack My Bitch Up
Slick Idiot - It Won't Do
X Marks the Pedwalk - I See You
VNV Nation - DSMO
PIG - Rope
Pigface - Blow U Away (G.T.F.A.F.M.)
ohGr - Borderline
The Damned - Shadow to Fall (Leaether Strip Mix)
Spahn Ranch - Vortex
Sigue Sigue Sputnik - Virus
Fear Cult - Girls & Boys
Razed In Black - Visions
Die Krupps - Eggshell
Pigface - The Horse U Rode In On
Godhead - Bela Lugosi's Dead
Godhead - Fascination Street
Godhead - This Corrosion

References

2004 albums
Godhead (band) albums